Staring at The Sun is a novel by Julian Barnes published in 1986.

Plot summary 
Julian Barnes examines the ordinary life of Jean Serjeant from her childhood in the 1920s through her adulthood to the year 2020. Throughout her life, Jean learns to question the world's idea of truth while she explores the beauty and miracles of everyday life.

References

External links 
 Official Website of Julian Barnes

1986 British novels
Novels by Julian Barnes
Jonathan Cape books